Novo Lisice (Macedonian: Ново Лисиче) is a settlement in the city of Skopje, North Macedonia. It is 5 km from the Center of Skopje. Novo Lisice was built between 1985 and 1990.  The population is 98%  Macedonian, 1% Serbian and 0.5% Turkish.

Facilities
It has one of the biggest grade schools in North Macedonia: Lazo Angelovski.

Neighbourhoods of Skopje